The Collegiate Basilica of Santa Maria of Gandia, also known as "La Seu", is the principal church of the city of Gandia, (Valencia). Construction commenced in the 14th century.

The Collegiate Church of Santa María is a Valencian Gothic construction, located in the centre Gandia. Construction began in the 14th century and finalised two centuries later. Thanks to Pope Alexander VI, the temple was raised to the category of Collegiate. In the year 1931 was declared National Historic Monument.

The church consists only of one central nave with lateral chapels adjacent to the walls. Its austere architectural style was once supplemented with rich interior decorations of altarpieces, paintings and sculptures, which  disappeared during the Spanish Civil War.

The Seo of Gandia is in itself a small architectural jewel, where the Puerta Sur or the Puerta de Santa María and the Puerta de los Apóstoles are noteworthy, one of the first works of Damián Forment, precursor of the Spanish Renaissance.

See also 

 Monastery of Sant Jeroni de Cotalba 
 Route of the Borgias
 Route of the Valencian classics

External links 

Collegiate Basilica of Gandia 

Churches in the Valencian Community
Bien de Interés Cultural landmarks in the Province of Valencia
Route of the Borgias
Gandia